Arnold Marquis (6 April 1921 – 24 November 1990) was a German actor and voice talent. He was one of the best known and most frequently used dubbing voices of Germany, known especially as the voice of "tough guys"  like John Wayne, Charles Bronson or Lee Marvin.

Early life
Arnold Marquis was born in Dortmund on 6 April 1921 as the son of a banker. He was brought in contact with theatre by the head of the Bochum Schauspielhaus (theatre) Saladin Schmitt who also gave him his first acting job in 1939. Shortly thereafter Marquis was drafted into the Wehrmacht and wounded several times during World War II. Returning to Germany, he moved to Berlin. After some acting jobs, he was contacted by a representative of the Rank Organisation who was looking for a dubbing voice for Stewart Granger. His sonorous voice impressed the British film executives and in 1946 he received his first voice-acting assignment for Madonna of the Seven Moons (1945).

Career
Although he appeared in a number of film and TV productions over the decades, beginning in 1948 and ending in 1989, he never succeeded in establishing a "normal" acting career for himself. He was, however, the best-paid German voice actor, receiving daily wages of around DM 1,000. Among those actors he dubbed for the German version were Robert Mitchum, Kirk Douglas, Yves Montand, Richard Widmark, James Coburn, Charles Bronson, George C. Scott, Lino Ventura, Trevor Howard, Bud Spencer, Jack Klugman, and Lee Marvin. To German viewers, his distinctive gravelly voice became closely associated with many of these international film stars. This effect was most pronounced in the case of John Wayne, who reportedly personally selected Marquis as his voice-actor. After Wayne's death in 1979, Marquis published a music single "John Wayne, der Held" (also known as "Ich war die Stimme von John Wayne").

Marquis has been described as the "King of Dubbing Artists" (König der Synchronsprecher), and he was one of the most-used voice-artists ever, having accumulated over a thousand credits to his name. He did not like the label Synchronsprecher (speaker), preferring Synchron-Schauspieler (actor) instead.

He also appeared on stage at Berlin Boulevard theatres and his voice appeared in cigarette commercials for a brand that was using a Western theme for its advertising. According to his obituary in Der Spiegel: "As he grew older, he became ever more like his alter ego, John Wayne."

Personal
He was married three times and had a daughter called Gwendolyn. Marquis had problems with alcoholism and had to go through rehab. After smoking 80 cigarettes a day for decades, he died of lung cancer on 24 November 1990, in Berlin, Germany.

Filmography

References

1921 births
1990 deaths
German male voice actors
Deaths from lung cancer in Germany
20th-century German male actors